Jens Otto Ludwig (born 1968 in Frankfurt, Germany) is a University of Chicago economist whose research focuses on social policy, particularly urban issues such as poverty, crime, and education. He is McCormick Foundation Professor of Social Service Administration, Law, and Public Policy in the School of Social Service Administration and Harris School of Public Policy Studies at the University of Chicago, where he also serves as Co-Director of the university's Urban Education and Crime Labs.

Ludwig is also Project Director for the long-term evaluation of the Moving to Opportunity (MTO) randomized housing mobility experiment at the National Bureau of Economic Research (NBER), where he is also Co-Director of the Working Group on Economics of Crime and a Research Associate in the Program on Children and the Health Economics Program.

Among a variety of other current and previous posts, in 2012 Ludwig was also elected as Vice President of Association for Public Policy Analysis and Management and as a member of the Institute of Medicine of the National Academy of Sciences. In 2006 he received the David N. Kershaw Prize for Contributions to Public Policy by Age 40.

Select publications

References

External links
 University of Chicago faculty bio
 MTO long-term evaluation team page
 Personal NBER page

1968 births
Living people
21st-century American economists
Rutgers University alumni
Duke University alumni
University of Chicago faculty
Members of the National Academy of Medicine
German emigrants to the United States
Writers from Frankfurt